Somatorelin is a diagnostic agent for determining growth hormone deficiency. It is a recombinant version of growth hormone-releasing hormone (GHRH). 

Somatorelin has been used to study hormone deficiency (particularly growth hormone deficiency), cognitive impairment, sleep disorders, and aging.

See also
 List of growth hormone secretagogues

References

Peptides

http://www.hghninja.com/